Charles John Ellicott (1819–1905) was a distinguished English Christian theologian, academic and churchman. He briefly served as Dean of Exeter, then Bishop of the united see of Gloucester and Bristol.

Early life and family
Ellicott was born in Whitwell, Rutland on 25 April 1819. He was educated at Stamford School and St John's College, Cambridge. 

He married Constantia Ann Becher at St Marylebone Parish Church, London on 31 July 1848. One of their children was the composer Rosalind Ellicott.

Ecclesiastical career
Following his ordination into the Anglican ministry in 1848, he was Vicar of Pilton, Rutland and then Professor of Divinity at King's College London and Hulsean Professor of Divinity at Cambridge. The chancel of St Nicholas' Church, Pilton was rebuilt in 1852 in 13th-century style. 

In 1861, he was appointed Dean of Exeter. Two years later he was nominated the bishop of the See of Gloucester and Bristol on 6 February and consecrated on 25 March 1863. In 1897, Bristol was removed from Diocese, but he continued as Bishop of Gloucester until resigning on 27 February 1905. He died in Kent on 15 October 1905, aged 86.

Works
Historical Lectures on the Life of Our Lord Jesus Christ: Being the Hulsean Lectures for the Year 1859. With Notes, Critical, Historical, and Explanatory, 1862
Destiny of the Creature, 1865
Historical Lectures on the Life of Christ, 1870
Modern Unbelief, its Principles and Characteristics, 1877
Spiritual Needs in Country Parishes, 1888
Sacred Study
An Old Testament Commentary for English Readers, 1897 (Editor)
A New Testament Commentary for English Readers, 1878
St Paul's First Epistle to the Corinthians: With a Critical and Grammatical Commentary, 1887
Our Reformed Church and its Present Troubles, 1897
Some Present Dangers for the Church of England
Addresses on the Revised Version of Holy Scripture, 1901
Christus comprobator ; or, The testimony of Christ to the Old Testament : seven address
Considerations on the revision of the English version of the New Testament

Notes

Bibliography

External links

 
 
 

1819 births
People educated at Stamford School
People from Rutland
Alumni of St John's College, Cambridge
Fellows of St John's College, Cambridge
Academics of King's College London
Hulsean Professors of Divinity
Deans of Exeter
Bishops of Gloucester and Bristol
Bishops of Gloucester
1905 deaths
20th-century Church of England bishops
19th-century Church of England bishops
19th-century Anglican theologians
20th-century Anglican theologians